Lowell Bruce Laingen (August 6, 1922 – July 15, 2019) was an American diplomat who served as the United States Ambassador to Malta from 1977 to 1979. Laingen is best known for having been the most senior American official held hostage during the Iran hostage crisis, while serving as the chargé d'affaires (head of diplomatic mission) at the U.S. Embassy in Tehran.

Early life, naval service, and education
Laingen was born on a farm near Butterfield and Odin in Watonwan County, Minnesota. During World War II, Laingen served in the U.S. Navy in the South Pacific as a lieutenant.  After the war he graduated from St. Olaf College and obtained an M.A. in International Relations from the University of Minnesota.  He also studied at the National War College in 1968.

Diplomatic career
In 1949 Laingen joined the U.S. Foreign Service. He served at posts in Germany, Iran, Pakistan, and Afghanistan, and was then appointed Ambassador to Malta by President Gerald Ford in 1977.

Laingen was then sent back to Iran as the U.S. chargé d'affaires in June 1979, after ambassador William H. Sullivan and chargé d'affaires Charlie Naas were relieved of their posts by President Jimmy Carter. Laingen had previously served in Iran during the 1950s.

On November 4, 1979, the U.S. embassy was overrun by student protesters following the Iranian Revolution. 63 hostages were taken at the embassy, while Laingen and two others were seized at the Iranian Foreign Ministry Office. Mrs. Laingen tied a yellow ribbon about the oak at their home during the crisis. Laingen and 51 hostages were released on January 20, 1981, following 444 days of captivity. Laingen remains the last American head of mission to Iran, as direct bilateral diplomatic relations between the two governments were severed following the seizure of the embassy and have not been restored since.

After they were released from Iran in January 1981, Laingen and the other hostages arrived in the United States at the United States Military Academy, West Point, New York. Four months later, on May 26, the West Point Class of 1981 honored him as their graduation banquet speaker during a formal dining event in the Cadet Mess Hall. Laingen was awarded the State Department's Award for Valor along with several other recognitions.

Laingen's next position was that of Vice President of the National Defense University, a post traditionally held by a senior diplomat. He retired from the Foreign Service in 1987 after 38 years of service. Laingen previously served as the President of the American Academy of Diplomacy.

Later life and death 
In 2010 Laingen was presented the Lifetime Contributions to American Diplomacy Award by the American Foreign Service Association.

Laingen died on July 15, 2019, at an assisted living facility in Bethesda, Maryland, at the age of 96 from complications of Parkinson's disease.

See also
List of solved missing person cases

References

External links
Laingen, L. Bruce.  Yellow Ribbon: The Secret Journal of Bruce Laingen.  Washington, DC: Brassey’s, 1992.
Bruce Laingen Papers at Minnesota Historical Society

L. Bruce Laingen correspondence relating to his service in Iran is in the Library of Congress.

1922 births
2019 deaths
20th-century American diplomats
Ambassadors of the United States to Iran
Ambassadors of the United States to Malta
American people taken hostage
American expatriates in Germany
American expatriates in Afghanistan
American expatriates in Pakistan
People from Watonwan County, Minnesota
Military personnel from Minnesota
United States Navy personnel of World War II
American expatriates in Iran
National War College alumni
St. Olaf College alumni
University of Minnesota alumni
Iran hostage crisis
United States Foreign Service personnel
United States Navy officers